General McLean may refer to:

Francis McLean (British Army officer) (c. 1717–1781), British Army brigadier general
Hugh Havelock McLean (1854–1938), Canadian Army brigadier general (promoted to major general upon retirement)
Kenneth McLean (1896–1987), British Army lieutenant general
Nathaniel McLean (1815–1905), Union Army brigadier general

See also
Jeremiah McLene (1767–1837), Pennsylvania Militia major general in the American Revolutionary War
Sir Fitzroy Maclean, 1st Baronet (1911–1996), British Army major general
Sir Fitzroy Maclean, 8th Baronet (c. 1770–1847), British Army general